Hearfield Glacier is a tributary glacier which flows east-southeast along the south side of the Cartographers Range and enters Trafalgar Glacier just east of Aldridge Peak, in the Victory Mountains of Victoria Land, Antarctica. It was named by the northern party of the New Zealand Federated Mountain Clubs Antarctic Expedition, 1962–63, for B. Hearfield, a leading New Zealand alpinist and a member of the New Zealand Geological Survey Antarctic Expedition, 1957–58, which also worked in the Tucker Glacier area.

References

Glaciers of Victoria Land
Borchgrevink Coast